The Towra Point Nature Reserve is a protected nature reserve that is located in Sutherland Shire, southern Sydney, New South Wales, in eastern Australia. The  reserve is situated on the southern shores of Botany Bay at Kurnell, within the Sutherland Shire. The reserve is protected under the Ramsar Convention as a wetland of international importance as an important breeding ground for many vulnerable, protected, or endangered species. The Towra Point Aquatic Nature Reserve is located in the surrounding waterways.

History
{
  "type": "ExternalData",
  "service": "geoshape",
  "ids": "Q7830302"
}
Kurnell was inhabited by the Dharawal people, and there are three middens and one relic that still remain today at the Towra Point Nature Reserve.

Captain Cook mapped Botany Bay when he landed in 1770, including Towra Point. Early European colonialists ran horses and cattle on Towra Point, despite the poor condition of the land for such a purpose. In 1827, "Towra Point" and "Towra Bay" were recorded as local names by the surveyor Robert Dixon. Another name known for the area was "Stinkpot Bay". In 1861, Thomas Holt bought Towra Point, and divided it into paddocks for grazing or growing corn. Sheep grazing was particularly disastrous, and many thousands of sheep died of footrot and are buried at Towra Point. In the late 1870s, Thomas Holt began oyster farming at Weeney Bay in Towra Point. In 1935, the Parks and Playgrounds Movement of NSW opposed an application to mine for shell at Towra Point. During World War II, a radar station was established, and a causeway built. In 1946, Towra Point was considered as a location for a second Sydney airport.

In the 1960s, movement began to preserve Towra Point led initially by the President of Sutherland Shire, Arthur Gietzelt, and Tom Uren, the then Federal Minister for Urban Affairs. In 1965 Ian Griffith, state MP for Cronulla, praised the idea, but was met by community backlash. In March 1969, the then Prime Minister, John Gorton ruled out Towra Point as a potential site for a second airport, citing community noise problems. The opening to Botany Bay was dredged in the 1970s to assist shipping, but this refracted the wave patterns in the bay, focusing them on Towra Point, causing erosion. The building of the revetment wall in Port Botany was also thought to contribute to the changed wave patterns. In 1974 and 1975, the waves off Towra were so strong that teens surfed there.

Following lobbying by Ray Thorburn, the reserve was bought by the Government of Australia in 1975, attempting to fulfil obligations to JAMBA, which would come into force in April 1981. This was the first time that the Australian Government had bought land for nature conservation purposes within a state. Mangroves at Quibray Bay, Weeney Bay and Towra Point were impacted –  of mangroves were affected, and  died.

In 1981, another oil spill occurred at the Matraville refinery, causing more damage to the mangroves. In 1982, Towra Point was officially made a nature reserve. In 1983 Towra was suffering from erosion – the Elephant's Trunk, a peninsula of Towra had shrunk to 3 metres wide.  The seagrasses were also being eaten by sea-urchins – the population had exploded from 20,000 per hectare in 1979 to 80,000 by 1983. It was declared a Ramsar site (or wetland of international importance) in 1984, at the time meeting Ramsar criteria 1, 2, 3 and 6. In 2009, Towra Point met Ramsar criteria 2, 3, 4 and 8. In 1987, the Towra Point Aquatic Nature Reserve was created, covering  in the waterways surrounding Towra Point. Towra Point Nature Reserve also attempts to meet the Federal government's obligations to CAMBA, which came into force in 1988.

In 1990, the Elephant's Trunk was eroded so much that the tip broke off into an island.  By this time, Towra Beach was so eroded that trees that were part of the forest were "tumbling into the water".  The Friends of Towra Point volunteer group was founded in February 1997 and they do such activities as bush regeneration, seed collection, vegetation surveys and habitat creation for the little tern. They also coordinate the annual Clean Up Australia Day activities at Towra Point. Habitat creation involves sandbagging the eroding Towra Lagoon, nest tagging, and clearing areas around nests.

In 2003, it was proposed to undertake beach nourishment at Towra Point, involving 60,000 cubic metres of sand.  While this had an immediate negative effect on some amphipod species, they had recovered by 2005. In January 2004, 24 little tern were killed after picnickers and a dog accidentally landed on Towra Spit Island.  In 2004, a 1.5 million dredging project was undertaken to cut off Towra Spit Island from the rest of Towra Point to provide a fox-free environment. In around 2007, the La Perouse Aboriginal Community began sending trainees to work in the area for the NSW National Parks & Wildlife Service as part of the "Towra Team", combining bush regeneration work with learning traditional Aboriginal cultural skills.

In 2010, artificial roosting posts were installed by the Office of Environment & Heritage to supplement the roosting habitat in the area. In the 2010 breeding season, 72 little tern fledged. In 2012, the site received a "Grey Globe" award of shame, given to Ramsar sites that are considered to be under threat.

Habitats

Towra Point, atop an ancient river delta deposit, has many distinct habitats – these diverse habitats are part of why Towra Point is a Ramsar site. The habitats of the reserve are:
 Salt marshes
 Mangroves
 Littoral rainforests
 Turpentine forests
 Lagoons
 Beaches

In 2001, the mangrove forests of Towra Point were described as varying in width between tens and hundreds of metres and largely consisting of the grey mangrove Avicennia marina with the river mangrove Aegiceras corniculatum growing in patches along the edge of the forest closest to the landward edge.

Species
Towra Point Nature Reserve is home to many endangered, vulnerable, protected and exotic species. This list is from the NSW Government's Environment and Heritage department website – a comprehensive listing, including numbers, scientific names, and protection status, can be found at this link.

Birds

Amphibians

Mammals

Reptiles

Plants

Human effects
The ecosystem surrounding Towra Point has been impacted as a result of human interaction.

Positive effects

Humans can maximise the area of healthy, functioning intertidal wetlands by minimising their impacts and by developing management strategies that protect, and where possible rehabilitate these ecosystems at risk.

The following are positive ways of trying to protect or rehabilitate intertidal wetlands.
 ExclusionThose responsible for the management of wetland areas often facilitate public access to a small, designated area while restricting access to other areas. Provision of defined boardwalks and walkways is a management strategy used to restrict access to vulnerable areas, as is the issuing of permits whilst visiting Towra Point Nature Reserve.
 EducationIn the past, wetlands were regarded as waste-lands. Education campaigns have helped to change public perceptions and foster public support for the wetlands. Due to their location in the water catchment area, education programs need to teach about total catchment management programs. Educational programs include guided tours for the general public, school visits, media liaison, information centres, conference presentations, interpretive signage, publications and facts sheets. Staff should also include education officers.
 Actiontoo little is known about the intertidal wetland system to successfully reinstate all natural conditions. Management plans focus on the rehabilitation of the site and the removal of human-induced stresses. For example, fox and rabbit baiting, removal of weeds (at Weedy Pond).
 DesignDesign interventions have proved successful in minimising sources of natural stress. At Towra Point Beach, for example, there is a sandbag wall to help prevent salt water from leaking into the fresh-water Towra Lagoon.
 LegislationLegislation and regulations are used to protect Towra Point Wetlands. Conventions that Australia has signed in regard to Towra Point Wetlands are the Ramsar Convention, the Japan–Australia Migratory Bird Agreement and the China–Australia Migratory Bird Agreement (CAMBA). Legislation that Australia and New South Wales have passed in regard to Towra Point Wetlands are the Australian Wetlands Policy, the New South Wales Wetlands Management Policy (1996) and the State and Environmental Planning Policy 14 on Coastal Wetlands.

Negative effects
 Changed wind patternsdue to high-rise near some wetland areas e.g. Bicentennial Park South, at Rockdale.
 Alteration of water flowsthrough construction of roads.
 Removal of resources for urban and industrial land usesThese also increase turbidity and toxins in the water supplied to mangroves. (The removal can also result in changed energy flows and nutrient cycles, affecting food chains for both sedentary and migratory fauna)
 Replacement of wetland areasfor parks, playing fields or pasture.
 Destruction of sea grassesin areas adjoining wetlands can affect energy flows and nutrient cycles as species levels will be affected.
 Introduction of exotic speciese.g. foxes, rabbits, sheep, cattle, pigs. – change energy flows and nutrient cycles. Birds are particularly affected, for example the little tern.
 Indirect influences from adjacent sitese.g. weed infestation (lantana – Towra Point) – carried into the wetlands by horses from the nearby stables.
 Tramplingfrom illegal access
 Threat of oil spillsKurnell Refinery near Towra Point, 31 oil spills between 1957 and 1987 averaging .
 Recreational horse ridingon the reserve and unsupervised recreational use of the reserve (e.g. dog walking)
 Boatingdisturbs wildlife in the park, and creates pollution.
 Fishingkills fish, which affects the food chains operating within the reserve.
 Erosion of Towra Beachdue to wave refraction from the Sydney Airport runway which causes the freshwater Towra Point Lagoon to become saline
 Fragmentation of the reserveby private land ownership
 Bay developmentin general, including the Sydney Airport runway and the oil refinery. There have also been concerns that the Sydney Desalination Plant will impact negatively on the reserve.
 Illegal rubbish dumpinghas occurred both in the reserve and near the entrance. In late 2004, a large amount of dumped asbestos was discovered.
 Land destabilisationdue to extensive mining of the larger dunes on Towra Point during the twentieth century it has been suggested that if the site was ravaged by strong enough storms breaks in the point could occur and breach the gentle lagoons of Towra Point.
 Runoffdue to most of the surrounding land being used for urban and industrial purposes. Stormwater from the Kurnell Refinery runs through the Ramsar-listed area of Towra Point Nature Reserve.
 Subsidence near the walkway, subsidence has been recorded, which has encouraged the establishment of mangroves in the upper swamp.

Management of the reserve

Traditional
The traditional objectives for the management of wetland areas were built around the use of wetland resources for food, shelter and tools. Grey mangrove wood, for example, was used to make shields, shells were made into fishing hooks; and marine animals were used for food.

Contemporary
 Identify management goals and objectivesToday management plans for wetlands focus on the preservation and sustainable use of sites for recreation, conservation and education purposes. This may involve some exclusion zones but many areas are open to recreational and educational activities.
 Define management unit and boundariesThe "management unit" for many intertidal wetlands is often difficult to define because of the large number of stakeholders. For example, the Towra Point wetland has input from NSW National Parks & Wildlife Service, NSW Fisheries, Sutherland Shire Council, Friends of Towra Point and recreational users.
 Develop and implement management plansAn intertidal wetland is a dynamic system. As our knowledge of ecosystems has increased community attitudes have changed. Communities are now demanding that these ecosystems are protected and effectively managed.

Care has been taken to develop management plans that are both realistic and flexible. They need to take into account scientific and technological advances, changing social and political attitudes and variations in the level of funding. Management plans also need to be consistent with Australia's international obligations under JAMBA, CAMBA and Ramsar.

Applicable legislation and international environmental law

International environmental law
Ramsar Convention (1971), JAMBA (1981), Bonn Convention (1983), CAMBA (1988), ROKAMBA (2006), the Partnership for the Conservation of Migratory Waterbirds and the Sustainable Use of their Habitats in the East Asian–Australasian Flyway (2006), Convention on Biological Diversity (1992).

Federal environmental law
As the Towra Point area is Ramsar listed, this attracts the operation of the federal Environment Protection and Biodiversity Conservation Act 1999 and regulations. Section 17B provides that a person is guilty of a criminal offence if (a) the person takes an action [see:s.523]; and (b) the action results or will result in a significant impact on the ecological character of a wetland; and (c) the wetland is a declared Ramsar wetland. Towra Point Nature Reserve is listed a component of Littoral Rainforest and Coastal Vine Thickets of Eastern Australia, a critically endangered ecological community under the EPBC Act.

State environmental law
In addition to land use planning law, the following Acts are applicable National Parks and Wildlife Act 1974 (NSW), Environmental Planning and Assessment Act 1979 (NSW), Fisheries Management Act 1994 (NSW), Threatened Species Conservation Act 1995 (NSW) and applicable SEPPs (e.g. State Environmental Planning Policy No 39—Spit Island Bird Habitat).  Following a review, several SEPPs were repealed in favour of using Local Environmental Plans.

Towra Point Nature Reserve has been listed as being part of the Coastal Dune Littoral Rainforest ecological community, an endangered ecological community under the TSC Act.

References

Further reading

External links
Sutherland Shire Environment Centre - Towra Point (the virtual tour is excellent)
Sydney University Excursion
NSW Fisheries - Towra Point Aquatic Nature Reserve

Ramsar sites in Australia
Nature reserves in Sydney
Endangered ecological communities
Geography of Sydney
Kurnell Peninsula
Protected areas established in 1982
1982 establishments in Australia
Sutherland Shire